Norway competed at the 2022 Winter Paralympics in Beijing, China which took place between 4–13 March 2022.

Medalists

The following Norwegian competitors won medals at the games. In the discipline sections below, the medalists' names are bolded.

| width="56%" align="left" valign="top" |

| width="22%" align="left" valign="top" |

Administration

Cato Zahl Pedersen served as Chef de Mission.

Competitors
The following is the list of number of competitors participating at the Games per sport/discipline.

Alpine skiing

Norway competed in alpine skiing.

Men

Biathlon skiing

One Norwegian athlete competed in biathlon.

Men

Cross-country skiing

Norway competed in cross-country skiing.

Men

Women

Relay

Wheelchair curling

Norway competed in wheelchair curling.

Summary

Round robin

Draw 1
Saturday, March 5, 14:35

Draw 3
Sunday, March 6, 9:35

Draw 5
Sunday, March 6, 19:35

Draw 7
Monday, March 7, 14:35

Draw 8
Monday, March 7, 19:35

Draw 10
Tuesday, March 8, 14:35

Draw 11
Tuesday, March 8, 19:35

Draw 12
Wednesday, March 9, 9:35

Draw 13
Wednesday, March 9, 14:35

Draw 15
Thursday, March 10, 9:35

See also
Norway at the Paralympics
Norway at the 2022 Winter Olympics

References

Nations at the 2022 Winter Paralympics
2022
Winter Paralympics